Fergus mac Echdach was king of Dál Riata (modern western Scotland) from about 778 until 781.

He succeeded Áed Find. He is stated to have been a son of Eochaid mac Echdach, and thus a brother of Áed. Some much later sources make him a son of Áed, but this is not credited by modern studies. His death is noticed in 781 by the Annals of Ulster.

The next reported king of Dál Riata is Donncoirce.

References

 Anderson, Alan Orr, Early Sources of Scottish History A.D 500–1286, volume 1. Reprinted with corrections. Paul Watkins, Stamford, 1990. 
 Broun, Dauvit, The Irish Identity of the Kingdom of the Scots in the Twelfth and Thirteenth Centuries. Boydell, Woodbridge, 1999. 
 Broun, Dauvit, "Pictish Kings 761–839: Integration with Dál Riata or Separate Development" in Sally M. Foster (ed.), The St Andrews Sarcophagus: A Pictish masterpiece and its international connections. Four Courts, Dublin, 1998.

External links
CELT: Corpus of Electronic Texts at University College Cork includes the Annals of Ulster, Tigernach, the Four Masters and Innisfallen, the Chronicon Scotorum, the Lebor Bretnach (which includes the Duan Albanach), Genealogies, and various Saints' Lives. Most are translated into English, or translations are in progress

781 deaths
Kings of Dál Riata
8th-century Irish monarchs
8th-century Scottish monarchs
Year of birth unknown